Ochthera mantis, the mantis fly, is a shore fly (family Ephydridae). The species was first described by Charles De Geer in 1776.

It is a Holarctic species with a limited distribution in Europe.

Biology
Ochthera mantis is a predatory fly found primarily on sandy or muddy shores, with the also predatory larvae being aquatic.

References

"Mantis Fly Ochthera mantis (De Geer 1776)". Encyclopedia of Life. Retrieved November 17, 2020.

Ephydridae
Insects described in 1776
Diptera of North America
Diptera of Europe
Taxa named by Charles De Geer